This is a list of all the opinions written by Claire L'Heureux-Dubé during her tenure as puisne justice of the Supreme Court of Canada.

1987-1988

1989
 R. v. Duguay, [1989] 1 SCR 93 (Dissent)
 R. v. Howard, [1989] 1 SCR 1337 (Dissent)
 R. v. D. (L.E.), [1989] 2 SCR 111 (Dissent)
 R. v. L. (J.E.), [1989] 2 SCR 510 (Dissent)
 R. v. Nygaard, [1989] 2 SCR 1074

 Note: This part of the list is incomplete

1990
 R. v. Rodney, [1990] 2 SCR 687 (Dissent)
 R. v. Chambers, [1990] 2 SCR 1293 (Dissent)
 R. v. Arkell, [1990] 2 SCR 695
 Stelco inc. v. Canada (Attorney general), [1990] 1 SCR 617
 Knight v. Indian head school division no. 19, [1990] 1 SCR 653
 R. v. Martineau, [1990] 2 SCR 633 (Dissent)
 Harrison v. University of British Columbia, [1990] 3 SCR 451 (Dissent)

 Note: This part of the list is incomplete

1991
 R. v. Sheridan, [1991] 2 SCR 205
 R. v. Cole, [1991] 1 SCR 904
 R. v. Romeo, [1991] 1 SCR 86
 R. v. Seaboyer; R. v. Gayme, [1991] 2 SCR 577 (concurrence/dissent)
 Note: This part of the list is incomplete

1992
 Moge v. Moge, [1992] 3 S.C.R. 813
 Lapointe v. Hôpital Le Gardeur, [1992] 1 SCR 382
 R. v. Murdock, [1992] 2 SCR 164
 R. v. J. (M.A.), [1992] 2 SCR 166
 R. v. Bennett, [1992] 2 SCR 168
 R. v. Forster, [1992] 1 SCR 339 (Dissent)
 R. v. Comeau, [1992] 3 SCR 473

 Note: This part of the list is incomplete

1993
 R. v. Brown, [1993] 2 SCR 918 (Dissent)
 Haig v. Canada, [1993] 2 S.C.R. 995
 Canada (Attorney General) v. Mossop [1993] 1 SCR 554
 R. v. Brassard, [1993] 4 SCR 287
 Rodriguez v British Columbia (AG) [1993] 3 S.C.R. 519 (Dissent)

 Note: This part of the list is incomplete

1994
 R. v. H. (L.M.), [1994] 3 SCR 758
 R. v. Pozniak, [1994] 3 SCR 310 (Dissent)
 R. v. Harper, [1994] 3 SCR 343 (Dissent)
 Note: This part of the list is incomplete

1995
 R. v. M. (N.), [1995] 2 SCR 415
 R. v. U. (F.J.), [1995] 3 SCR 764 (concurrence)
 Note: This part of the list is incomplete

1996
 R. v. Majid, [1996] 1 SCR 472 (majority)
 R. v. Evans, [1996] 1 S.C.R. 8 (concurrence)
 R. v. Edwards, [1996] 1 S.C.R. 128 (concurrence)
 Gould v. Yukon Order of Pioneers, [1996] 1 S.C.R. 571 (dissent)

 Note: This part of the list is incomplete

1997
 R. v. Osvath, [1997] 1 SCR 7 (majority)
 R v Leipert, [1997] 1 S.C.R. 281 (concurrence)
 R v Carosella, [1997] 1 S.C.R. 80 (dissent)
 Toronto (City of) Board of Education v Ontario Secondary School Teachers' Federation, District 15, [1997] 1 S.C.R. 487 (concurrence)
 R v Stillman, [1997] 1 S.C.R. 607 (dissent)
 R v Melnichuk, [1997] 1 S.C.R. 602 (Dissent)
 R. v. Melnichuk, [1997] 1 SCR 602 (Dissent)
 Canadian Union of Public Employees, Local 301 v Montreal (City of), [1997] 1 S.C.R. 793 (majority)
 Pointe-Claire (City of) v Quebec (Labour Court), [1997] 1 S.C.R. 1015 (dissent)
 R v La, [1997] 2 S.C.R. 680 (concurrence)
 Hickman Motors Ltd v Canada, [1997] 2 S.C.R. 336 (concurrence)
 R v Feeney, [1997] 2 S.C.R. 13 (dissent)
 R v Greyeyes, [1997] 2 S.C.R. 825 (majority)
 R v Esau, [1997] 2 S.C.R. 777 (dissent)
 R v Cogger, [1997] 2 S.C.R. 845 (majority)
 Pasiechnyk v Saskatchewan (Workers' Compensation Board), [1997] 2 S.C.R. 890 (dissent)
 R v Lifchus, [1997] 3 S.C.R. 320 (concurrence)
 R v S(RD), [1997] 3 S.C.R. 484 (concurrence)
 S(L) v S(C), [1997] 3 S.C.R. 1003  (Majority)
 R v Labrecque, [1997] 3 S.C.R. 1001 (Majority)
 R v Bablitz, [1997] 3 S.C.R. 1005 (Majority)

 Note: This part of the list is incomplete

1998
 R. v. Maracle, [1998] 1 SCR 86
 R. v. Jussila, [1998] 1 SCR 755
 R. v. Bernier, [1998] 1 SCR 975
 R. v. Abdallah, [1998] 1 SCR 980
 R. v. Daigle, [1998] 1 SCR 1220
 R. v. Wells, [1998] 2 SCR 517

 Note: This part of the list is incomplete

1999
 R. v. Ewanchuk, [1999] 1 S.C.R. 330 (concur)
 Corbiere v. Canada (Minister of Indian and Northern Affairs), [1999] 2 S.C.R. 203 (Concur)
 R. v. White, [1999] 2 S.C.R. 417
 Hickey v. Hickey, [1999] 2 S.C.R. 518
 Best v. Best, [1999] 2 S.C.R. 868
 Baker v. Canada (Minister of Citizenship and Immigration), [1999] 2 S.C.R. 817
 Delisle v. Canada (Deputy Attorney General), [1999] 2 S.C.R. 989
 New Brunswick (Minister of Health and Community Services) v. G. (J.), [1999] 3 S.C.R. 46
 R. v. W. (G.), [1999] 3 S.C.R. 597
 R. v. F. (W.J.), [1999] 3 S.C.R. 569
 R. v. Brown, [1999] 3 S.C.R. 660
 R. v. Timm, [1999] 3 S.C.R. 666

2000
 R. v. L.F.W., [2000] 1 S.C.R. 132; 2000 SCC 6
 R. v. R.N.S., [2000] 1 S.C.R. 149; 2000 SCC 7
 R. v. R.A.R., [2000] 1 S.C.R. 163; 2000 SCC 8
 R. v. A.G., [2000] 1 S.C.R. 439; 2000 SCC 17
 Quebec v. Boisbriand (City), [2000] 1 S.C.R. 665; 2000 SCC 27
 R. v. Starr, [2000] 2 S.C.R. 144; 2000 SCC 40 (dissent)
 R. v. Hamelin, [2000] 2 S.C.R. 273; 2000 SCC 42
 Winnipeg Child and Family Services v. K.L.W., [2000] 2 S.C.R. 519; 2000 SCC 48

2001
 R. v. Sharpe, [2001] 1 S.C.R. 45; 2001 SCC 2 (dissent)
 Trinity Western University v. British Columbia College of Teachers, [2001] 1 S.C.R. 772; 2001 SCC 31 (dissent)
 114957 Canada Ltée (Spraytech, Société d'arrosage) v. Hudson (Town), [2001] 2 S.C.R. 241; 2001 SCC 40 (major)
 Proulx v. Quebec (Attorney General), [2001] 3 S.C.R. 9; 2001 SCC 66 (dissent)
 R. v. Advance Cutting & Coring Ltd., [2001] 3 S.C.R. 209; 2001 SCC 70 (concur)
 R. v. Nette, [2001] 3 S.C.R. 488; 2001 SCC 78 (concur)
 R. v. Golden, [2001] 3 S.C.R. 679; 2001 SCC 83  (dissent)
 Dunmore v. Ontario (Attorney General), [2001] 3 S.C.R. 1016; 2001 SCC 94 (concur)

2002
 Lavoie v. Canada, [2002] 1 S.C.R. 769; 2002 SCC 23
 R. v. Burke, [2002] 2 S.C.R. 857; 2002 SCC 55
 Babcock v. Canada (Attorney General), [2002] 3 S.C.R. 3; 2002 SCC 57
 R. v. Shearing, [2002] 3 S.C.R. 33; 2002 SCC 58
 CIBC Mortgage Corp. v. Vasquez, [2002] 3 S.C.R. 168; 2002 SCC 60
 R. v. Noël, [2002] 3 S.C.R. 433; 2002 SCC 67
 Nova Scotia (Attorney General) v. Walsh, [2002] 4 S.C.R. 325; 2002 SCC 83
 Gosselin v. Québec (Attorney General), [2002] 4 S.C.R. 429; 2002 SCC 84
 Prud'homme v. Prud'homme, [2002] 4 S.C.R. 663; 2002 SCC 85

L'Heureux-Dube